The  is a museum that explains volcanoes.  It is near Mount Aso, the largest active volcano in Japan.

The Museum is in Kusasenri, Aso City, Kumamoto Prefecture.

External links
Aso Volcano Museum 

Museums in Kumamoto Prefecture
Geology museums in Japan
Natural history museums in Japan
Aso, Kumamoto
Volcanology